The 1948 Wayne Tartars football team represented Wayne University (later renamed Wayne State University) as an independent during the 1948 college football season. Under first-year head coach Herbert L. Smith, the team compiled a 4–4 record.

Schedule

References

Wayne
Wayne State Warriors football seasons
Wayne Tartars football